The Harbin International Conference Exhibition and Sports Center is a convention center for Harbin, China.  It hosts various conventions.  It has also hosted the 2007 Cup of China figure skating competition and hosted events for 1996 Asian Winter Games and 2009 Winter Universiade. The facility has a floor space of 63,000 square meters (about 700,000 square feet). It is home to a multi-purpose stadium with a seating capacity of 48,000 spectators and a 10,603-seated gymnasium.

Stadium 

The Harbin International Convention and Exhibition Centre Stadium is a multi-purpose stadium and is the main venue of the convention center. It is currently used mostly for football matches. The stadium has a seating capacity of 48,000 spectators.

Gymnasium 

Harbin International Conference Exhibition and Sports Center Gymnasium is an indoor sporting arena located at the convention centre.  The capacity of the arena is 10,603 spectators.  It hosts indoor sporting events such as basketball and volleyball, and also hosted the indoor events of the 2009 Winter Universiade.

See also
 Sports in China

References

External links
Information on venue
Stadium information

Indoor arenas in China
Sports venues in Heilongjiang
Buildings and structures in Harbin
Football venues in China
Sport in Harbin
Sports venues completed in 1996
Convention and exhibition centers in China